X-Mas Festival was a heavy metal festival/tour held annually in Europe from 1999 to 2005. It was organized by the Belgian booking agency Metallysee. The 2006 and 2007 editions have been cancelled, and the future of the festival is in doubt. Metallysee plans to launch a new tour in January 2008 under the name Black Winter Festival.

History
The 2006 edition was cancelled after Unleashed, Six Feet Under, God Dethroned, Cataract and soon later Krisiun decided to pull out, Trail of Tears disbanded and Soilwork refused to headline the tour. The last announced lineup featured Gorefest, Belphegor, Prostitute Disfigurement, Madder Mortem, SkyForger and Darzamat. The owner of the agency blamed one of his employees for the cancellation, and this person left the company. Despite this, the 2007 edition was also called off without a reason. The lineup should have featured Mayhem, Samael, Malevolent Creation, Onslaught, Wykked Wytch, Blood Red Throne and Innerfire. The Onslaught website claims that the festival has been postponed, and will be held in January 2008 under the name Black Winter Festival.

Lineups

2005
Hypocrisy
Exodus
Entombed
Naglfar
Wintersun
Fear My Thoughts

2004
Marduk
Napalm Death
Finntroll
Vader
The Black Dahlia Murder

2003
Deicide
Destruction
Nile
Amon Amarth
Akercocke
Dew-Scented
Graveworm

2002
Six Feet Under
Exodus
Marduk
Immolation
Kataklysm
Hate Eternal
Dying Fetus
Impaled Nazarene
Macabre
Antaeus
Ragnarok

2001
Cannibal Corpse
Kreator
Marduk
Nile
Krisiun
Vomitory

2000
Morbid Angel
Enslaved
The Crown
Dying Fetus
Behemoth
Hypnos

1999
Morbid Angel
Krisiun
God Dethroned
Amon Amarth
Gorgoroth
Occult

References

External links

Heavy metal festivals in Europe
Concert tours
Music festivals established in 1999